Absent is a silent film released in 1928 starring Clarence Brooks. It was directed by Harry Gant. The film is about a veteran with memory loss who finds employment at a mining camp, aids his hosts, and finds new purpose. It was produced by Rosebud Film Corporation. It was followed on by Brooks in Georgia Rose.

A write-up published in the Pittsburgh Courier gave the film a rave review after a preview showing. Henry Jones wrote that Brooks "covered himself with glory" with what Jones described as his best performance up to that time.

Cast
 Clarence Brooks as Soldier
 George Reed as Miner
 Virgil Owens as Villain
 Rosa Lee Lincoln
 Floyd Shackeford

References

External links 
 Absent at AFI Catalog of Feature Films

1928 films
American silent films
1920s American films